The Car Audio Sports Organization is MECA (Mobile Electronics Competition Association, Inc.) started in 1999.  Web sites are:
www.mecacaraudio.com and www.mecaevents.com

HBO VICE News feature from 2017 Finals:  https://www.youtube.com/watch?v=u5TrgEOrZ1Q&t=54s

SQL (Sound Quality League) focuses on high performance musical systems: Sound Quality (SQ and SQ2), custom installs, and RTA Freq-Out contests.  Vehicles are classified by audio system complexity of design.  There are seven classes overall in this category.  They are Stock, Street, Modified Street, Modified, Modex, Extreme, and Master.  Each class has certain restrictions, with the most being in Stock, and the least in Master.  MECA utilizes a standard test tracks, which feature various songs to test different aspects of sound quality, for all of its judging at competitions.  The TermLab Magnum is the official 4X points contest RTA Freq-Out meter.  For 4X points Sound Quality contests, 3 Judges evaluate the audio system separately, and the scores are averaged to determine the winners in 7 classes.  There are 4 Install classes.  They are Stock, Street, Modified, and Extreme.  Certain criteria must be met to receive the best score possible, and these are outlined in the rule book.  RTA Freq-Out has no class separation.
MECA added Dueling Demos to the contest list in 2013, and there are 3 classes:  Street+, Modified, and Extreme.

MECA released the "Tantric Tuning" CD in 2017 with licensing from Chesky Records.  The CD is available in the Shop at the MECA web site.

SPL (Sound Pressure League) focuses on audio systems that are created to reproduce loud bass, notes and music, with Sound Pressure and Park & Pound contests.  State and World Champions and USA National Points Champions are credentialed each year.  Vehicles are grouped according to the "Pressure Class" method which separates the vehicles by complexity of audio system design, combined with the potential of the audio system to make "bass".  The "Pressure Class Formula" adds woofer cone surface area with sub amp(s) power.  Woofer cone surface area is measured in square inches.  For example, a round 12" woofer is 113 sq. inches and a square 12" woofer is 144 sq. inches.  Power is determined by the TermLab Magnum meter.  The TermLab meter is the official MECA decibel contest meter.  There are 18 SP (Sound Pressure) classes and 5 Park & Pound classes.  Sound Pressure is measured inside the vehicle.  Park & Pound is measured outside the vehicle, 6' from the passenger side, with heavy-duty bass music tracks, for example: BassMekanik 808 CD released 2009.

"Show & Shine" car/truck/motorcycle contests.  Judging based on cleanliness, attention to details, and modifications (done properly and part of an integrated theme).

MECA Kids events for youngsters and their parents, include Sound Pressure, Park & Pound, Dueling Demos, and Show & Shine for powerwheels type toys.

The Rule Book is free on-line at www.mecacaraudio.com/2019SQLRuleBook.pdf and for SPL www.mecacaraudio.com/2019SPLRuleBook.pdf.  Social media sites include www.facebook.com/mecacaraudio, and www.twitter.com/MECA_Car_Audio

105 USA events in with 700+ members, 
114 USA events in 2009.
130+ USA events in 2013 with 500+ members,
90+ USA Retail Members
20+ Manufacturer Members
105 vehicles competed at 2008 World Finals Soundfest in Nashville, Tennessee.
2009 World Finals Soundfest at the Tennessee State Fairgrounds in Nashville on October 3-4th.
2010 World Finals Soundfest to be held in Lebanon, TN on October 16-17th, at the James E. Ward Agricultural Center.
2018 World Finals Soundfest in Louisville, KY on weekend of October 14, 2018.

http://www.12voltnews.com
http://www.ecsmagazine.com
http://www.me-mag.com
http://www.pasmag.com

Motor clubs
Clubs and societies in the United States